is a city located in Tokushima Prefecture, Japan.

Geography
Yoshinogawa is located in the northern part of Tokushima Prefecture on the island of Shikoku. It is located on the south bank of the Yoshino River, which runs east to west and most of the population is concentrated in the Tokushima Plain along this river.

Neighbouring municipalities 
Tokushima Prefecture
 Mima
 Awa
 Kamiita
 Kamiyama
 Ishii

Climate
Yoshinogawa has a Humid subtropical climate (Köppen Cfa) characterized by warm summers and cool winters with light to no snowfall.  The average annual temperature in Yoshinogawa is 14.8 °C. The average annual rainfall is 2137 mm with September as the wettest month. The temperatures are highest on average in August, at around 26.1 °C, and lowest in January, at around 4.0 °C.

Demographics
Per Japanese census data, the population of Yoshinogawa has declined slowly over the past 30 years.

History 
As with all of Tokushima Prefecture, the area of Yoshinogawa was part of ancient Awa Province.  During the Edo period, the area was part of the holdings of Tokushima Domain ruled by the Hachisuka clan from their seat at Tokushima Castle. The area was divided into 11 villages within Oe District, Tokushima with the creation of the modern municipalities system on October 1, 1889.  The city of Yoshinogawa was established on October 1, 2004, from the merger of the towns of Kamojima, Kawashima and Yamakawa, and the village of Misato (all from Oe District, which was dissolved as a result of this merger).

Government
Yoshinogawa has a mayor-council form of government with a directly elected mayor and a unicameral city council of 20 members. Yoshinogawa contributes two members to the Tokushima Prefectural Assembly. In terms of national politics, the city is part of Tokushima 2nd district of the lower house of the Diet of Japan.

Economy
Yoshinogawa has a mixed economy of agriculture and regional commerce. Due to its proximity to the city of Tokushima, it is increasingly becoming a commuter town.

Education
Yoshinogawa has 11 public elementary schools and four public middle schools operated by the city government and one public high school and one public combined middle/high school operated by the Tokushima Prefectural Department of Education. The prefecture also operates one special education school for the handicapped.

Transportation

Railway
 Shikoku Railway Company – Kōtoku Line
  -  -  -  -  -  -  -  -

Highways

Local attractions
 Fujii-dera, 11th temple on the Shikoku Pilgrimage
 Kawashima Castle

Notable people from Yoshinogawa
Masaharu Gotōda, (1914 – 2005), politician
Ryuho Okawa, (b. 1956) a religious leader, established Happy Science, from Kawashima-cho
Ryusei Takeoka, (b. 2001) baseball player
Yoshikawa Akimasa, (1842 – 1920) cabinet minister

References

External links

 Yoshinogawa City official website 
 Kitaro Shikoku Peace Bell Project

 
Cities in Tokushima Prefecture